Alevtin Osipov (born 13 May 1969) is a former Kazakh professional football player. He played for Ekibastuzets in the Soviet Second League and Kazakhstan Premier League.

International career
Osipov made thirteen appearances for the Kazakhstan national football team in 1997.

See also
Football in Kazakhstan

References

External links
 
 

1969 births
Living people
People from Horlivka
Soviet footballers
Kazakhstani footballers
Kazakhstan international footballers
Association football defenders
FC Irtysh Pavlodar players